Puzanov (from пузо meaning belly) is a Russian masculine surname, its feminine counterpart is Puzanova. It may refer to
Alexander Puzanov (1906–1998), Russian statesman
Nikolay Puzanov (1938–2008), Russian biathlete
Yekaterina Puzanova (born 1979), Russian middle distance runner

Russian-language surnames